Linda Kozlowski (born January 7, 1958) is an American former actress. She is best known for her role as Sue Charlton in the Crocodile Dundee film series (1986–2001), with the first installment earning her a Golden Globe Award nomination.

Early life 
Linda Kozlowski was born and raised in a Polish American family in Fairfield, Connecticut, the daughter of Helen E. (née Helena Parniawska) and Stanley M. Kozlowski (né Stanisław Kozłowski). She is a 1976 graduate of Fairfield's Andrew Warde High School. Kozlowski graduated from the Juilliard School's drama division in 1981.

Career 
Kozlowski debuted in the 1981–1982 off-Broadway production How It All Began. She played "Miss Forsythe" on Broadway in Death of a Salesman and in 1984 took the same role for the 1985 film version.

Her big break came in 1986 when she was cast as the female lead, opposite Paul Hogan, in the Australian film Crocodile Dundee, during the filming of which their on-screen chemistry sparked a real-life romance. In 1987, Kozlowski was nominated for a Golden Globe award in the Best Supporting Actress category for her performance as Sue Charlton. Two years later, she revisited her starring role with Hogan in Crocodile Dundee II. Also, in 1988, she starred with Bill Paxton, Tim Curry and Annie Potts in Pass the Ammo and the TV miniseries Favorite Son.

Since that time, she has appeared in Almost an Angel (also starring Hogan) in 1990, Backstreet Justice (with Paul Sorvino) and The Neighbor (with Rod Steiger) in 1994, and Village of the Damned in 1995. In 2001, she starred again with Hogan in Crocodile Dundee in Los Angeles.

She has largely left the acting business because of dissatisfaction with her roles, stating: "These straight-to-video, schlocky films I was getting were giving me an ulcer, basically because I was the only one on the set that cared about anything... Between that and my biological clock, I decided to give it all away."

Personal life 
Kozlowski co-starred in Crocodile Dundee (1986) with Australian actor Paul Hogan, and two years later in Crocodile Dundee II, when they became a couple. They married on May 5, 1990, after he divorced his wife Noelene. They tried to settle in Australia but moved to Los Angeles in late 1990s.

Kozlowski and Hogan have one son, Chance. Kozlowski had been married once prior to her marriage to Hogan. In October 2013, Kozlowski filed for divorce from Hogan, citing irreconcilable differences, with the divorce finalized in 2014.

Filmography

Awards and nominations

References

External links 

 
 

Living people
American film actresses
American stage actresses
American television actresses
American people of Polish descent
Juilliard School alumni
Actors from Fairfield, Connecticut
20th-century American actresses
21st-century American women
1958 births